Morsea is a genus of monkey grasshoppers in the family Eumastacidae. There are about seven described species in Morsea.

Species
These seven species belong to the genus Morsea:
 Morsea californica Scudder, 1898 (chaparral monkey grasshopper)
 Morsea catalinae Rentz & Weissman, 1981 (Catalina monkey grasshopper)
 Morsea dumicola Rehn & Hebard, 1918 (yavapai monkey grasshopper)
 Morsea islandica Rentz & Weissman, 1981 (island monkey grasshopper)
 Morsea kaibabensis Rehn & Grant, 1958 (kaibab monkey grasshopper)
 Morsea piute Rehn & Grant, 1958 (piute monkey grasshopper)
 Morsea tamalpaisensis Rehn & Hebard, 1909 (tamalpais monkey grasshopper)

References

Further reading

 
 
 

Eumastacidae